Lipari is a comune including six of seven islands of the Aeolian Islands (Lipari, Vulcano, Panarea, Stromboli, Filicudi and Alicudi) and it is located in the Tyrrhenian Sea off the northern coast of Sicily, southern Italy; it is administratively part of the Metropolitan City of Messina. Its population is 12,821, but during the May to September tourist season, the total population may reach up to 20,000. It is also the name of the biggest island in the archipelago, where the main urban area of the comune is located.

Geography

Lipari Island is the largest of a chain of islands in a volcanic archipelago situated in between Vesuvius and Etna.  The island has a surface area of 37.6 km2 and is 30 km from Sicily.  Besides the main town, most of the year-round population resides in one of the four main villages: Pianoconte is almost due west across the island, Quattropani in the northwest, Acquacalda along the northern coast, whereas Canneto is on the eastern shore north of Lipari town. The highest point on the island is Monte Chirica at 602 m (1975 ft).

Geology

Geologists agree on the fact that Lipari (island) was created by a succession of four volcanic movements, the most important of which was the third one, presumably lasting from 20,000 BC to 13,000 BC. A further important phenomenon should have happened around 9000 BC. The last recorded eruptions occurred in the fifth century AD when airborne pumice, together with volcanic ash, covered the Roman villages of the island. The volcanoes are considered active, and steaming fumaroles and hydrothermal activity may still be seen. As a result of its volcanic origin, the island is covered with pumice and obsidian.  Pumice mining has become a large industry on Lipari, and the pale pumice from Lipari is shipped worldwide.

History

Neolithic period

In Neolithic times Lipari was, much like Sardinia, one of the few centres of trading in obsidian, a hard black volcanic glass prized by Neolithic peoples for the extremely sharp cutting edges that can be obtained. Lipari's history is rich in incidents as witnessed by the recent retrievals of several necropoli and other archaeological sites. Humans seem to have inhabited the island already in 5000 BC, though a local legend gives the eponymous name Liparus to the leader of a people coming from Campania.

Bronze Age

In the early Bronze Age, at the end of the third millennium BC, new settlers of Aeolian origin came from Mycenaean Greece, giving their name to the islands. They had already settled in Metapontum in Italy and used the islands as outposts for controlling trading routes through the strait of Messina.

In the 13th century BC, the islands were settled by Ausinian peoples from the coasts of Campania, who introduced the myth of King Liparus from whom the town’s name derives.

Successive domestic buildings have been excavated on the acropolis dating from the 18th c. BC and underlying the ancient Roman town.

Late Bronze Age

In the Mycenaean Period, Lipari has yielded pottery from LHI to LHIII.

Iron Age

Lipari's continuous occupation may have been interrupted violently when in the late 9th century BC an Ausonian civilization site was burned and apparently not rebuilt. Many household objects have been retrieved from the charred site.

Greek and Roman periods

Greek colonists from Knidos arrived at Lipara ~580 BC after their first colonization attempt in Sicily failed and their leader, Pentathlos, was killed. They settled on the site of the village now known as Castello. The colony successfully fought the Etruscans for control of the Tyrrhenian Sea. 

The town was initially concentrated upon the summit of the rock which played the role of acropolis, seat of religious cults and of public life, but in the course of the first century of its existence, an increase in the population necessitated an expansion into the area at the foot of the rocky slopes and on to the top of the Civita hill. A first city wall, built sometime in the 5th century BC was erected along outcrops at the bottom of the slopes of the rock, leaving outside the modern district of Diana, which was destined from the beginning to accommodate the city necropolis. A second city wall was built in the 4th century BC to enclose the new residential area bounded to the north and south by the river-beds of Santa Lucia and Ponte, which in ancient times ran into the two bays at the foot of the rock. The city wall ran near the two river-beds and then joined on to the Acropolis and the Civita hill. The mighty fortification, of which some traces are visible today in the district of Diana, divided the town from the necropolis.

Carthaginian forces succeeded in holding the site briefly during their struggles with Dionysios I, tyrant of Syracuse in 394 BC, but once they were gone the polis entered a three-way alliance which included Dionysios' new colony at Tyndaris. Lipara prospered, but in 304 BC Agathokles took the town by treachery and is said to have lost all of his pillage from it in a storm at sea. 

Lipara became a Carthaginian naval base during the first Punic War, but fell to Roman forces in 252–251 BC. It was occupied by Agrippa in Octavian's campaign against Sextus Pompeius. Under the Roman Empire it was a place of retreat and exile and was enjoyed because of its thermal baths using natural springs. The Emperor Caracalla sent his wife, Plautilla, and her brother, Plautius, into exile here for the rest of their lives.

Many objects recovered from old wrecks are now in the Aeolian Museum of Lipari.

From the Middle Ages to present

Lipari was probably an episcopal see from the 3rd century onward, with the first bishop being St. Agatone, who, according to tradition, had found the sacred remains in his cathedral. The presence of the relics has been attested since at least 546.

In the 9th century, Sicily was conquered by the Arabs, and soon Saracen pirates began to raid across the Tyrrhenian Sea, with dramatic effects for Lipari. In 839 the Saracens slaughtered much of the population, the relics of St. Bartholomew were moved to Benevento, and Lipari was eventually almost totally abandoned. The Normans conquered the Arabs throughout Sicily between 1060 and 1090, and repopulated the island once their rule was secure. The Lipari episcopal seat was reinstated in 1131.

Though still plagued by pirate raids, the island was continually populated from this time onward. Rule of the island was passed from the Normans to the Hohenstaufen Kings, followed by the Angevins, and then the Aragonese, until Carlos I, the Aragonese King, became the Spanish King, and was then quickly crowned Holy Roman Emperor Charles V.

Franco-Ottoman attack

In 1544, Hayreddin Barbarossa, together with the French fleet of Captain Polin under a Franco-Ottoman alliance, ransacked Lipari and enslaved the entire population. Jérôme Maurand lamented about the depredation to his Christian fellow men during the campaign at Lipari: "To see so many poor Christians, and especially so many little boys and girls [enslaved] caused a very great pity." He also mentioned "the tears, wailings and cries of  these poor Lipariotes, the father regarding his son and the mother her daughter... weeping while leaving their own city in order to be brought into slavery by those dogs who seemed like rapacious wolves amidst timid lambs".

A number of the citizens were ransomed in Messina and eventually returned to the islands.

Charles V then had his Spanish subjects repopulate the island and build the massive city walls atop the walls of the ancient Greek acropolis in 1556.

The walls created a mighty fortress still standing today.  The acropolis, high above the main town, was a safe haven for the populace in the event of a raid. While these walls protected the main town, it was not safe to live on the rest of the island until Mediterranean piracy was largely eradicated, which did not occur until the 19th century.

20th century

During the 1920s–1940s, the Lipari Island were used for the confinement of political prisoners including: Emilio Lussu, Curzio Malaparte, Carlo Rosselli, Giuseppe Ghetti and Edda Mussolini. During the 1930s, the islands were used to detain exiled members of the fascist, Croatian nationalist Ustaše movement.

Culture and media
 The large archaeological museum extensively covers history of the Aeolian Islands from prehistoric to classical times, vulcanology, marine history, and the paleontology of the western Mediterranean.
 The geographer Strabo identified Lipari with Aeolia, the island of the winds in Homer's Odyssey.
 The ending sequence of Kaos by Paolo and Vittorio Taviani showed children sliding down the vast slopes of white pumice that flowed into the sea.
 The annual feasts of St. Bartholomew.
 On 25 July 2013, the mayor of Lipari issued an ordinance banning the wearing of "bikinis, thongs or other swimming costumes in the town centre" to be punished with a fine of 500 euros (equivalent to about $700 in 2014).

People
 Francesco Scoglio - Football Coach
 Christian Riganò - Football player
 Peppino Mangravite - Artist

See also
List of volcanoes in Italy
 List of islands of Italy

References

External links

Princeton Encyclopedia of Classical Sites
Website for Finding Nino Travelogue about living on Lipari, the 2008 winner of the ASTW Travel Book of the Year Award.

Aeolian Islands
Islands of Sicily
Stratovolcanoes of Italy
Volcanoes of the Tyrrhenian
Metropolitan City of Messina